Sir John de Aston (fl. 1475) of Parkhall and Heywood was a Sheriff of Staffordshire and of Warwickshire in the reign of Edward IV of England.

Biography
Sir John was the son of Robert de Aston, of Parkhall and Heywood, and his second wife Isabel, daughter of Sir William Brereton, of Brereton, Staffordshire.

Ashton was one of the adherents of William, Lord Hastings, who was put to death in a very summary manner, by the protector, afterwards King Richard III. The name of John Aston, Esq. is to be found in a list of 89 persons, knights, esquires, and gentlemen, who engaged to stand by Lord Hastings, whether in peace or war.

Sir John was Sheriff of Staffordshire in 1475, (15th of the reign of Edward IV), and 1481 (20th  of the reign of Edward IV). He was also twice Sheriff of Warwickshire.

Family
Sir John married Elizabeth, daughter of Sir John Delves, of Doddington, Cheshire. They had sons and daughters:
 John, his successor and a favourite of Henry VIII
 Richard, later lived at Whorcross, Staffordshire. 
 Robert. 
 Elizabeth, married John Basset of Blore. 
 —— married Dudley, of Sedgeley. 
 Isabella, married Humphrey O'Keover. 
 —— married Braddock, of Adelbaldeston. 
 Catherine, married Thomas Blount of Burton. 
 Margaret, married 1st, Thomas Kynardetley of Loxley; and 2nd Ralph Wolseley. 
 Alice, married John Dodd, of Choriey. 
 —— married Colwich, of Colwich, Staffordshire. 
 Rose married Thomas Child, of Ormesley, Shropshire.

Notes

References
 
 

Attribution

Further reading

15th-century English people